The Constitution of the Comoros was adopted on 23 December 2001 and last amended in May 2009.

Current constitution

Constitutional history

1977–1991
The 1977 constitution (text ) proposed by the government of Ali Soilih was approved by only 55 percent of voters in a October 1977 referendum.

After taking office, Ahmed Abdallah consolidated power, beginning with the writing of a new constitution, approved in 1978 (text ). The document combined federalism and centralism. It granted each island its own legislature and control over taxes levied on individuals and businesses resident on the island (perhaps with an eye to rapprochement with Mahore), while reserving strong executive powers for the president. It also restored Islam as the state religion, while acknowledging the rights of those who did not observe the Muslim faith. The new constitution was approved by 99 percent of Comoran voters on October 1, 1978.

Abdallah kept opponents from competing with him by amending the 1978 constitution. As part of what one observer wryly called the process of "remov[ing] his most avid successors from temptation", Abdallah pushed through a constitutional amendment in 1985 that abolished the post of prime minister, a move that made the president both head of state and head of the elected government. The amendment also diminished the status of Ali Mroudjae, the erstwhile prime minister and a likely future candidate for president. Another 1985 amendment took away many of the powers of the president of the National Assembly, including his right to become interim head of state in the event of the incumbent's death. The amendment transferred the right of succession to the president of the Supreme Court, an appointee of the head of state.

In 1989, Abdallah sought a constitutional amendment that would allow him to run for a third term in 1990. The official result of the referendum was a 92.5 percent majority in favor of the amendments proposed by Abdallah, which now created "the conditions for a life presidency," warned one opposition leader. Balloting was marked by the now customary manipulation by the government, and voters reacted angrily to abuses. Leaders of the banned opposition in bold public statements questioned the legitimacy of the referendum.

1992 constitution
The Constitution of the Federal Islamic Republic of the Comoros was approved by referendum on June 7, 1992. It replaced the constitution of 1978, as amended. Among the general principles enumerated in the preamble were the recognition of Islam as the state religion and respect for human rights as set forth in the UN Universal Declaration of Human Rights. All citizens were declared equal before the law.

The president was elected by direct universal suffrage to a five-year term and was limited to two terms. All persons over the age of eighteen who possessed full civil and political rights could vote.

The president could be elected to no more than two terms. The president was both head of state and head of government. The president nominated ministers to form the Council of Government. The president also nominated governors for each of the three islands for five-year terms. If the presidency became vacant, the president of the Supreme Court would serve as interim president until an election could be held.

The constitution provided for a bicameral legislature. The forty-two members of the "lower" house, the Federal Assembly, represented electoral wards for four-year terms. The Federal Assembly met for two forty-five-day sessions per year, in April and October. The upper house, the Senate, had fifteen members, five from each island, who were chosen by an Electoral College. The post of prime minister was held by a member of the party holding a majority of seats in the Federal Assembly. The number of political parties could be regulated by federal law. Areas subject to federal legislation included defense, communications, law, international trade, federal taxation, economic planning, and social services.

As a federal republic, Comoros assigned autonomy to the three constituent islands in matters that, in accordance with the constitution, did not come within the purview of the national government. Each island had a council whose members were elected to represent electoral wards for four-year terms.

The judiciary was considered independent of the executive and legislature. The Supreme Court examined constitutional issues and supervised presidential elections. The high court also arbitrated when the government was accused of malpractice.

1996 and 1999 constitutions
 1996 Constitution 
 1999 Constitutional Act

References

Footnotes

Works cited

External links
Constitution of Comoros
Constitution of Comoros

Comoros
Politics of the Comoros